Salcedoa is a monotypic genus of flowering plants belonging to the family Asteraceae. The only species is Salcedoa mirabaliarum.

Its native range is Hispaniola.

References

Stifftioideae
Monotypic Asteraceae genera